In critical theory, power-knowledge is a term introduced by the French philosopher Michel Foucault. According to Foucault's understanding, power is based on knowledge and makes use of knowledge; on the other hand, power reproduces knowledge by shaping it in accordance with its anonymous intentions. Power (re-) creates its own fields of exercise through knowledge.

The relationship between power and knowledge has been always a central theme in the social sciences.

History of the concept 
In his 1934 play ‘The Rock’ T. S. Eliot wrote: ‘Where is the wisdom we have lost in knowledge? Where is the knowledge we have lost in information?’. This division between information, knowledge and wisdom inspired many generations of information scientists later on.

In the field of political economy, Harold Innis wrote extensively on the "monopoly of knowledge", in which empires over the history exploited information and communication resources to produce exclusive knowledge and power.

In 1943, C. S. Lewis wrote that power granted by knowledge was not power over nature, as commonly supposed, but was instead power that some men wielded over others, using nature to do so.

Foucault's contributions 
Foucault was an epistemological constructivist and historicist. Foucault was critical of the idea that humans can reach "absolute" knowledge about the world. A fundamental goal in many of Foucault's works is to show how that which has traditionally been considered as absolute, universal and true in fact are historically contingent. To Foucault, even the idea of absolute knowledge is a historically contingent idea. This does however not lead to epistemological nihilism; rather, Foucault argues that we "always begin anew" when it comes to knowledge.

Foucault incorporated mutuality into his neologism power-knowledge, the most important part of which is the hyphen that links the two aspects of the integrated concept together (and alludes to their inherent inextricability).

In his later works, Foucault suggests that power-knowledge was later replaced in the modern world, with the term governmentality which points to a specific mentality of governance.

Modern developments 
While in most of the 20th century the term ‘knowledge’ has been closely associated with power, in the last decades ‘information’ has become a central term as well. With the growing use of big-data, information is increasingly seen as the means to generate useful knowledge and power.

One of the recently developed model, known as the Volume and Control Model, describes how information is capitalized by global corporations and transforms into economic power. Volume is defined as the informational resources—the amount and diversity of information and the people producing it. Control is the ability to channel the interaction between information and people through two competing mechanisms: popularization (information relevant to most people), and personalization (information relevant to each individual person).

According to this understanding, knowledge is never neutral, as it determines force relations. The notion of power-knowledge is therefore likely to be employed in critical, normative contexts. One example of the implications of power-knowledge is Google’s monopoly of knowledge, its PageRank algorithm, and its inevitable commercial and cultural biases around the world, which are based on the volume and control principles. A recent study shows, for example, the commercial implications of Google Images algorithm, as all search results for the term 'beauty' in different languages predominantly yield images of white young females.

Connection to Information 
In information sciences 'knowledge' is defined as a higher form of information, which requires understanding the patterns and creating useful meaning of the information people collect.

References 

Neologisms
Social philosophy